Newstead is a rural settlement on the outskirts of Hamilton, in the Waikato District and Waikato region of New Zealand's North Island.

The settlement includes the global headquarters of Livestock Improvement Corporation, a multinational farming co-operative which provides genetics information to the dairy sector. The campus, established in 1951, is a combined farm, laboratory, testing facility and research centre.

Hamilton Park Cemetery, Hamilton's main operational cemetery, is located just west of the settlement. It consists of burial lawns, a crematorium and two chapels, and is operated by Hamilton City Council.

Demographics

Hamilton Park had a population of 1,593 at the 2018 New Zealand census, an increase of 264 people (19.9%) since the 2013 census, and an increase of 531 people (50.0%) since the 2006 census. There were 504 households, comprising 834 males and 759 females, giving a sex ratio of 1.1 males per female. The median age was 36.4 years (compared with 37.4 years nationally), with 399 people (25.0%) aged under 15 years, 291 (18.3%) aged 15 to 29, 738 (46.3%) aged 30 to 64, and 168 (10.5%) aged 65 or older.

Ethnicities were 89.8% European/Pākehā, 11.1% Māori, 1.7% Pacific peoples, 6.4% Asian, and 1.3% other ethnicities. People may identify with more than one ethnicity.

The percentage of people born overseas was 14.1, compared with 27.1% nationally.

Although some people chose not to answer the census's question about religious affiliation, 47.5% had no religion, 41.4% were Christian, 0.9% were Hindu, 0.2% were Buddhist and 1.7% had other religions.

Of those at least 15 years old, 330 (27.6%) people had a bachelor's or higher degree, and 168 (14.1%) people had no formal qualifications. The median income was $41,100, compared with $31,800 nationally. 294 people (24.6%) earned over $70,000 compared to 17.2% nationally. The employment status of those at least 15 was that 675 (56.5%) people were employed full-time, 207 (17.3%) were part-time, and 24 (2.0%) were unemployed.

History

19th century

James Runciman, a Scottish-born captain in the Waikato War, took over the 1517 acres at Newstead in the mid 1860s, establishing the Marsh Meadows farm. He travelled to the United States in 1882 to investigate cheese-making and briefly established a cheese-making factory, but closed it due to financial difficulties. He also experimented with sugar beet.

Runciman donated 20 acres to establish Marsh Meadows School, which opened in 1890. It later became Newstead School.

He regularly planted trees, or donated trees for school children to plant on special occasions. By 1889, he had planted 50,000 trees. Most were milled, but some were still standing by the 21st century.

John Levis, a farmer born in County Cork, Ireland, settled on 153 acres in Newstead in 1884. He also became active on the local school committee.

Bank of New Zealand appointed John Graham, a native of County Tyrone, Ireland, as the manager of the New Zealand Loan and Mercantile Agency Company's Woodside pastoral property in 1886. By 1902, it had between 2000 and 3000 sheep.

Henry Reynolds purchased 1600 acres of land in Newstead in 1886, establishing the Newstead Estate. He set up the first creamery on his farm in 1890.

The New Zealand Dairy Association established a creamery at the site in 1900. The plant had an 8 horse-power portable engine, and a processing capacity of 300 gallons. During its first season the factory had 10 suppliers, and processed the milk of 350 cows each day.

20th century

By 1902 the settlement had a post office and was connected to the rail network.

The first telephone line to Newstead was from the Woodlands Estate at Gordonton, where Reynolds had previously lived and worked. The road is still called Telephone Road.

21st century

In February 2011, Private Kirifi Mila was buried at Newstead's Hamilton Park Cemetery, after being killed in preventable workplace accident during service in the War in Afghanistan. The burial was attended by family members and dignitaries, including Sam Lotu-Iiga.

A new reception and lounge facility was proposed for the cemetery in 2015 but the plan was scrapped.

As of 2017, the cemetery was busy seven days a week and was considering extending operations to 10 hours a day. It is projected to face rising demand until at least 2045.

New CCTV security cameras were installed at the cemetery in 2019, in an attempt to stop burnouts and vandalism. It followed several cases of threatening, aggressive and anti-social behavoiur.

Education

The school was established in 1890 and held centennial celebrations in 1990.

References

Waikato District
Populated places in Waikato